Daedalochila uvulifera, common name the peninsula liptooth, is a species of air-breathing land snail, a terrestrial pulmonate gastropod mollusk in the family Polygyridae.

Subspecies 
 Daedalochila uvulifera bicornuta
 Daedalochila uvulifera margueritae
 Daedalochila uvulifera striata

References

Polygyridae
Gastropods described in 1852